The Rio de Janeiro–São Paulo Megalopolis, also known as the Brazilian Megalopolis is a megalopolis in Southern Brazil consisting of the cities of Rio de Janeiro and São Paulo, as well as their surrounding urban areas.

The entire Rio–São Paulo area is also sometimes considered a conurbation, and plans are in the works to connect the cities with a high-speed rail. Yet the government of Brazil does not consider this area a single unit for statistical purposes, and any population numbers would be synthetic.

As of December 2013, Rio de Janeiro to São Paulo is the third-busiest air traffic route by passenger volume, according to Amadeus.

References

Metropolitan areas of Brazil
Metropolitan areas of São Paulo
Rio de Janeiro (city)